The National Council of Ayllus and Markas of Qullasuyu (CONAMAQ) is a confederation of traditional governing bodies of Quechua-, Aymara- and Uru-speaking highland indigenous communities in the departments of La Paz, Oruro, Potosí, Cochabamba, Chuquisaca and Tarija, Bolivia. Specifically, it represents the following 16 suyus: Jacha Carangas, Jatun Quillacas, Asamajaquis, Charcas Qara Qara, Council of Ayllus of Potosí, Qara Qara Suyu, Sora, Kallawaya, Leco, Larecaja, Colla, Chui, Paca Jake, Ayllus of Cochabamba, Kapaj Omasuyus and Yapacaní. CONAMAQ was founded on March 22, 1997, with the purpose of restoring the self-governance of "original nations" including "collective rights to land and natural resources, re-definition of administrative units and self-determination exercised through indigenous autonomies and direct representation in state institutions." CONAMAQ is a member of the National Coordination for Change, and of the Andean Coordination of Indigenous Organizations. It was a member of the Pact of Unity in Bolivia from its founding until December 2011.

Structure and Leadership
The organization's maximum governing body is its Jach'a Tantachawi, or Congress, six of which have been held so far, most recently in August 2009 in Oruro. These gatherings elect a leadership which includes two pairs of men and women: the Jiliri Apu Mallku and Jiliri Mama T’alla (first male and female leaders) and Arquiri Apu Mallku and Arquiri Mama T’alla (second male and female leaders). While theoretically equal, the male leaders represent the organization more often.

Internal conflict
Long a close ally of the government of Evo Morales, CONAMAQ became increasingly critical of it from 2011 onwards. The organization co-sponsored the Eight Grand National Indigenous March with the Confederation of Indigenous Peoples of Bolivia (CIDOB), backing the right of indigenous communities in the Isiboro Sécure National Park and Indigenous Territory to refuse a highway project through their land. Following the government's failed attempt to stop the march on September 25, 2011, CONAMAQ's leadership took an overtly critical tone toward the government, and left the pro-government Pact of Unity by a decision taken at its Seventh Jach'a T'antachawi. Under the leadership of Felix Becerra, CONAMAQ continued to coordinate closely with CIDOB and to jointly advance a draft law on indigenous consultation authorizing local indigenous communities to exercise free, prior, and informed consent over projects on their lands.

In 2013, several pro-government indigenous leaders, among them Hilarion Mamani Navarro (cacique mayor of Chichas, in Potosí Department) and Gregorio Choque Quispe (apu mallku of Kapaomasuyu, in La Paz department) campaigned to realign the movement with the government, demanding early elections to replace its national leaders. They are joined by Félix Lira of Charcas Qhara Qhara, Potosí; Jhonny Huanca of Larecaja, La Paz; Plácido Suntura of Jach’a Pakajaqi, La Paz; and Afro-Bolivian Renán Paco. These leaders and their supporters briefly took over CONAMAQ's office in September, one of six attempts they made to do so. In December, the pro-government faction and the existing organization each held an Eighth Jach'a T'antachawi in La Paz, the former on December 9 and 10, and the latter on December 12 and 13. The pro-government gathering designated Mamani and Choque as senior male leaders of the organization. The organization's Jach'a T'antachawi, organized by the incumbent leadership, designated Freddy Bernabé as its leader, with Cancio Rojas as the second male leader.
On January 14, 2014, the pro-government faction, helped by the police,  took the office of the organic CONAMAQ over by force. The National Assembly of Human Rights of La Paz granted the organic leaders a temporary office space, but days later the pro-governmental faction, again helped by the police, invaded this office too, and the organic CONAMAQ leaders had to vacate the office space that the Assembly of Human Rights of La Paz had given to them.

The Bernabé-led organization is recognized by the Andean Coordination of Indigenous Organizations and the Coordination of Indigenous Organizations of the Amazon Basin. The Pact of Unity recognizes Hilarion Mamani's leadership of CONAMAQ.

See also
 Ayllu
 Apu Mallku
 Qollasuyu

References

External links
Official website

Indigenous rights organizations in South America
Indigenous organisations in Bolivia
Organizations established in 1997